This is a list of fossiliferous stratigraphic units in Nunavut, Canada.

References

 

Nunavut
Geology of Nunavut